Matthias Schwab (born September 3, 1963 in Nuremberg) is a German doctor and university lecturer. He is director of the  Dr. Margarete Fischer-Bosch-Institute of Clinical Pharmacology located on the campus of the Robert-Bosch-Hospital in Stuttgart, an institution of the  Robert Bosch Stiftung, and holder of the Chair of  Clinical Pharmacology at the University of Tübingen as well as Medical Director of the Department of Clinical Pharmacology at the University Hospital Tübingen.

Life 
After graduating from the Dürer Gymnasium in Nuremberg, Schwab studied Medicine and obtained his doctorate in 1991 at the Institute for Toxicology and Pharmacology at the Friedrich-Alexander University of Erlangen–Nuremberg. After gaining his license to practice medicine, he obtained board qualifications for pediatric and adolescent medicine in 1996 and in clinical pharmacology in 2000.

He completed his habilitation in 2003 at the Eberhard Karls University of Tübingen. After a visiting professorship at the St. Jude Children’s Research Hospital in  Memphis (Tennessee, USA) he took over the management of the Dr. Margarete Fischer-Bosch Institute of Clinical Pharmacology and the Chair of Clinical Pharmacology at the University of Tübingen, where he has also been a co-opted professor of the faculty of mathematical and natural science since 2015.

His main research interests focus on pharmacological Genome Research and its importance for  Personalized Medicine. He is particularly interested in the application of new technologies in the context of pharmacogenomics including epigenetic aspects in connection with cancer therapies and immunosuppressants

Appointments as full professor for clinical pharmacology at the Medical University of Innsbruck,  Austria (2006), as well as professor and chair of clinical pharmacology with simultaneous position as senior physician in the clinic at Karolinska University and Karolinska University Hospital, Sweden (2010), he declined. Since 2018 he is Adjunct Professor of the Departments of Clinical Pharmacology and Biochemistry at Yerevan State Medical University, Armenia.

Scholarships, awards and administrative functions 
 2022: Member of the Academia Europaea
 2022–2025: Member of the Advisory Board of the German Federal Institute for Drugs and Medical Devices (BfArM)
 2021: Fellow of the British Pharmacological Society (BPS)
 2015/’16/’18/’20/’21/'22: Thomson Reuters/Clarivate Analytics Highly Cited Researchers, rubric “Pharmacology & Toxicology”, and “Cross Field”
 2016: Robert Pfleger-Research Award
 2015 and 2018: President of the German Society of Experimental and Clinical Pharmacology and Toxicology (DGPT)
 2015: Conferment of the Staufer medal in gold by the minister-president of Baden-Württemberg
 Since 2015: Chairman of the Medical Research Commission of the Academy of Sciences and Literature, Mainz
 2014: Full member of the German National Academy of Sciences Leopoldina
 2013 – 2018: Chair of the German Society of Clinical Pharmacology (DGKliPha)
 2012: Full member of the Academy of Sciences and Literature, Mainz
 2010 – 2022: Executive Board Member, Vice Chair and Chair of the Drug Metabolism & Transporter Section, International Union of Basic and Clinical Pharmacology
 2010–2017: Member of the governing body of the European Association for Clinical Pharmacology and Therapeutics (EACPT)
 Since 2008: Member of the Pharmacogenetics Sub-Committee of the International Union of Basic and Clinical Pharmacology (IUPHAR)
 Since 2007: Member of the Drugs Commission of the German Medical Association (AKdÄ)
 2005: Galenus von Pergamon  Award
 2004: Friedrich Hartmut Dost Award
 Since 2004: full member and deputy chairman of the Commission for Drugs for Children and Young People at the Federal Institute for Drugs and Medical Devices (BfArM), Germany
 Since 2004: Member of the ethics committee of the Medical Association of Baden-Württemberg

Publications (as Editor)

Journals 
 Since 2007: Editor-in-Chief of Pharmacogenetics & Genomics (with J. Yang, USA)
 Since 2018: Co-Editor in Chief of Drug Research
 Since 2008: Section Editor Pharmacogenomics & Personalized Medicine of Genome Medicine

Monographs

References 

1963 births
Living people
Academic staff of the University of Tübingen
20th-century German physicians
University of Erlangen-Nuremberg alumni
Scientists from Nuremberg
German pharmacologists
Physicians from Bavaria
21st-century German physicians
Members of Academia Europaea
Fellows of the British Pharmacological Society
Members of the German Academy of Sciences Leopoldina